is one of the most prominent women writers of contemporary Japan, with more than a dozen collections of poetry, several works of prose, numerous books of essays, and several major literary prizes to her name. She divides her time between the towns of Encinitas, California and Kumamoto in southern Japan. She is currently teaching at School of Culture, Media and Society in Waseda University, Tokyo.

Biography

Early career 
Born in 1955 in Tokyo, Japan, Itō became well known in the 1980s for a series of dramatic collections of poetry that described sexuality, pregnancy, and feminine erotic desire in dramatically direct language.  From her earliest work, Itō embarked on a lifelong battle against the stylized and artful language common in 20th-century Japanese poetry.  Much of her poetry is narrated in extended passages of relatively colloquial text.  Her poems so skillfully represent spoken language that they often give the illusion of being records of spoken speech.  Not coincidentally, commentators have often described Itō as a "shamaness" for her ability to channel voices onto the page.

Women's issues
In 1982, Itō's book ,'appeared in the series "The Present State of Women's Poetry," which was published by the Japanese publisher Shichōsha and also featured a number of rising young female poets, including Toshiko Hirata, Yōko Isaka, and Kōko Shiraishi. In the mid-1980s, Itō's writing gravitated to issues of the feminine body, sexuality, and motherhood, making her the most prominent voice of what came to be known as the "women's poetry boom." These poems probe the meaning of the mother-child relationship and the demands that motherhood places on the mother's identity and sexuality. For instance, in the often anthologized poem , she describes the feelings of a young mother experiencing postpartum depression and anger at her newborn, even though the world is congratulating her on becoming a mother. Her eagerness to explore women's issues has led some to think of her as a feminist writer, although this is a term that Itō has not always embraced in building her public persona.

Throughout her career, however, Itō has embraced the metaphor of the poet as a shamaness.  In 1991, she collaborated with the prominent feminist scholar Chizuko Ueno from Tokyo University on a collection of essays and poetry called , which the two likened to the collaboration between an Okinawan shamaness and the figure who makes sense of her utterances for the outside world.  A few years later in 1993, Itō explicitly played out the metaphor of poet as shamaness in her long narrative poem , in which she takes a story recorded from a shamaness in Tsugaru in the early 20th century and refashions it into a dramatic new myth of healing from sexual abuse and self-discovery.

Relocation to the US
Since at least the 1980s, Itō had been fascinated with Native American poetry, which she first read in Japanese translations.  In 1990, she met the American poet Jerome Rothenberg when he visited Japan.  Rothenberg had been a major force in re-examining Native American poetry in the movement known as "ethnopoetics," and he encouraged Itō to come to America.  She had recently separated from her husband, the literature scholar Masahiko Nishi, and at Rothenberg's invitation, she started making regular, extended trips to America with her children, before eventually settling in 1997 in Encinitas, California with her new partner, the British artist Harold Cohen.

The change of setting led to several significant changes in her writing, in terms of both genre and subject matter.  She began writing novellas, both because she was tired of poetry and because she felt prose was better suited to exploring her new experiences as an immigrant.  Several of her novellas from this time describe the difficulties of immigration and the experience of being a transplant in a new environment.

Since 2000
Itō returned to poetry, publishing several long, fantastic narrative works that blur the lines between prose and poetry. In these works, Itō writes about the experiences of modern people, often migrants or transnationals, but does so in a way that has an almost mythological grandeur and frequently veers into the surreal.

One of Itō's bestsellers was her book of essays , published in 2010.  This book consists of a series of personal essays about her involvement with the Buddhist classic, the Heart Sutra, and other Buddhist texts.  While relating the texts to her own life, she describes her understanding of the text and provides her own modern Japanese translation from the classical Chinese.  Itō's interest in Buddhism and Buddhist texts in particular had been visible earlier in her career, for instance, in the 1993 poem , which incorporates elements of folk Buddhist narrative, and the 2004 book , which retells several of the stories in the Heian-period Buddhist classic Nihon Ryōiki by the monk Kyōkai. In 2012, Itō published , a book of personal essays and contemporary Japanese translations of correspondence between the Japanese Buddhist monk Shinran and his mother.

A common theme in these books, especially The Heart Sutra Explained, Reading the Lamentations of Divergences Falteringly Out Loud, and the 2014 book  about the slow decline and death of Itō's father, is the question of how life changes as one grows older and faces death. (This is a major issue in Japan due to the demographic imbalances brought about Japan's declining birth rate and rise in numbers of senior citizens). As a means to understand and cope with this process, Itō frequently turns to Buddhist texts for inspiration.

In addition to these works of poetry and prose, Itō has published numerous books of essays, manga criticism, and translations of American literature for young Japanese readers.  Among the books she has translated into Japanese are The Cat in the Hat and Oh, the Places You'll Go! by Dr. Seuss, as well as the two books Out of the Dust and Witness by Karen Hesse.  In addition to her modern Japanese translations of the Buddhist texts mentioned above, she has also written a modern Japanese translation of a short story by Ichiyō Higuchi.

Itō divides her time between her home in Encinitas, California and Kumamoto in southern Japan. Itō's work is featured prominently in the Kumamoto Modern Literature Museum.

Awards
 1978: Gendai Shi Techo Prize for the poetry collection 
 1993: Nominated for Mishima Yukio Prize for 
 1998: Nominated for Akutagawa Prize for the novella 
 1999: Nominated for Akutagawa Prize for the novella 
 1999: Noma Literary Prize for New Writers for the novella 
 2006: Takami Jun Prize for the book 
 2007: Hagiwara Sakutarō Prize for the novel 
 2008: Murasaki Shikibu Prize for the novel

Bibliography
Translations into English
 Itō, Hiromi (2009), Killing Kanoko: Selected Poems of Hiromi Itō, translated by Jeffrey Angles. Notre Dame, IN: Action Books. .
 Itō, Hiromi (2014), Wild Grass on the Riverbank, translated by Jeffrey Angles. Notre Dame, IN: Action Books.
 Itō, Hiromi (2020), Killing Kanoko / Wild Grass on the Riverbank, translated by Jeffrey Angles. London: Tilted Axis Press. 
 Itō, Hiromi (2022), The Thorn Puller, translated by Jeffrey Angles. Berkeley, CA: Stone Bridge Press. . 

Translations into German
 Itō, Hiromi (1993), Mutter töten, translated by Irmela Hijiya-Kirschnereit. St. Pölten, Austria: Residenz verlag GmbH.  .
 Itō, Hiromi and Masahiko Nishi (1999), Das anachische Aschenputtel, translated by Richmod Bollinger and Yoriko Yamada-Bochynek. St. Pölten, Austria: Residenz verlag GmbH.  .
 Itō, Hiromi (2021), Dornauszieher. Der fabelhafte Jizo von Sugamo. Roman, translated by Irmela Hijiya-Kirschnereit. Berlin, Germany: Matthes & Seitz Verlag. .

Translations in Anthologies
 Itō, Hiromi in Kikuchi, Rina & Crawford, J. (eds.) (2017), Poet to Poet: Contemporary Women Poets from Japan, translated by Jeffrey Angles. Recent Work Press, Canberra: Australia. 
Secondary Sources
 Angles, Jeffrey, editor (2007).  Special issue on Itō Hiromi, U.S.-Japan Women's Journal, vol. 32.  ISSN 1059-9770.
 Morton, Leith (2004), Modernism in Practice: An Introduction to Postwar Japanese Poetry. Honolulu: University of Hawai'i Press.  .

See also
Japanese literature
Japanese poetry
Feminism

References

External links
 Poetry International Web Website which contains an English-language description of Itō's career and English translations by Jeffrey Angles of several of Itō's poems.
  at Western Michigan University.
 Hiromi Itō's personal blog Itō's personal blog written in Japanese.
 Japanese-language Wikipedia article Contains a thorough list in Japanese of Itō's publications.

 Writing About Death and Sexuality. An interview with Hiromi Itō Video by Louisiana Channel

1955 births
Japanese literature
20th-century Japanese novelists
21st-century Japanese novelists
Feminist writers
Feminist literature
Feminist fiction
Living people
20th-century Japanese poets
21st-century Japanese poets